Ring 1, or Ringgaden, is a ring road that surrounds the most central part of Aarhus, Denmark, roughly bounding the neighborhood of Midtbyen. It is part of the Danish national road network and is numbered O1, denoting a ring road. The total length of the road is about 8.8 km.

Geography 
Ring 1 connects the major road Marselis Boulevard in the south with Grenåvej in the north at Marienlund. Ringgaden is subdivided according to the geographical location and is named like this (south to north):

History 
Ideas for a ring road around Aarhus materialised politically in 1919, and it was subsequently constructed in several stages, beginning in 1923 and finishing in 1938.

See also 
 Ring 2 (Aarhus)

References

Sources 
 Aarhus Municipality: Nordre Ringgade, Kommuneatlas

External links 

Ring roads in Denmark
Transport in Aarhus
Infrastructure in Aarhus